Antony Anandarayar (17 July 1945 – 4 May 2021) was an Indian Catholic prelate who served as Archbishop of the Archdiocese of Pondicherry and Cuddalore. His episcopal motto in Latin is Servire in Fide et in Amore, which means To serve with Faith and Love. He died on 4 May 2021.

Biography
He has a doctorate in Missiology and a Doctorate in Canon Law.

He was ordained priest on 21 December 1971. He was nominated as Bishop of Ootacamund on 12 January 1997 and was consecrated by Cardinal Duraisamy Simon Lourdusamy with co-consecrators as Archbishop Michael Augustine and Archbishop Aruldass James on 29 January 1997.

He was appointed as archbishop for the Archdiocese of Pondicherry and Cuddalore on 10 June 2004 and installed on 5 July that year.

Pope Francis accepted his resignation on 27 January 2021 from the pastoral care of the Archdiocese of Pondicherry and Cuddalore after he reached the mandatory age of retirement in accordance with Canon Law.

In April 2021, he contracted COVID-19 and was hospitalised in St. Thomas Hospital, Chennai. Though he later tested negative, on 4 May morning, his health condition deteriorated as the oxygen saturation level was very low. He died the same day, 4 May 2021 at 9:30 pm.

His mortal remains were then brought to the Immaculate Conception Cathedral, Pondicherry, where he was laid for homage. The funeral Mass was celebrated on the evening of 5 May 2021. After that, he was laid to rest at the Clergy Cemetery inside the Cathedral Campus.

He thus served the Church as a priest for 50 years and as a bishop for 24 years.

Past career
Before becoming Archbishop of Pondicherry and Cuddalore he has held the following posts:
 1972-1976 - St. Joseph's Boarding, Cuddalore
 1976-1981 - Higher Studies, Rome
 1981 - Staff, St. Peter's Pontifical Seminary, Bangalore
 1982-1990 - Vice Rector, St. Peter's Pontifical Seminary, Bangalore
 1990-1996 - Rector, St. Peter's Pontifical Seminary, Bangalore
 1997-2004 - Bishop of Ootacamund

References

 
 

 

1945 births
2021 deaths
20th-century Roman Catholic bishops in India
21st-century Roman Catholic archbishops in India
20th-century Indian Roman Catholic theologians
Roman Catholic archbishops of Pondicherry and Cuddalore
People from Ariyalur district
Deaths from the COVID-19 pandemic in India